Alex Saxon (born September 10, 1987) is an American actor known for playing Wyatt in The Fosters, Max in Finding Carter, and Ace in Nancy Drew. He has also had roles in other television series: Awkward (2011); Ray Donovan (2013–2015); and The Mentalist (2015).

His work in film includes The Olivia Experiment (2012), Chapman (2013), and Compound Fracture (2013).

Early life
Saxon grew up in Liberty, Missouri, United States, a suburb of Kansas City.

Career
In 2013, Saxon was cast in a recurring role on The Fosters, a Freeform drama created by Peter Paige and Bradley Bredeweg. He also played the recurring role of Max on the MTV drama Finding Carter. Saxon was only initially hired for the pilot episode of the series but was brought back on a recurring basis after show runner Terri Minsky was impressed by his first scene. He was later informed by Minsky that his character was to be killed off towards the end of the first season. But a month later, he was told that decision had been reversed as both Minsky and network executives found that Saxon as Max was so likeable.

In March 2019, Saxon was cast as Ace in The CW mystery series Nancy Drew.

Filmography

References

External links
 

21st-century American male actors
Living people
People from Liberty, Missouri
1987 births
American male film actors
American male television actors